Line 10 (Turquoise), formerly Line D (Beige), is one of the seven lines operated by CPTM and one of the thirteen lines that make up the Sao Paulo Metro Rail Transport Network, in Brazil.

Stations

Trains

Most trains running at this line are part of the 2100 Series (Originally called CAF 440).  Imported from Spain, this model was projected to take long journeys.  Because of the cars' length, the model runs only in this line, which has long distances between the stations.  Has only four doors per car (usually the CPTM trains have eight).  Each train is composed of six cars, with air conditioning.

See also 
 Santos-Jundiaí Railroad
 Line 9 (CPTM)

Notes

References

External links

  Official page of the CPTM
  Secretaria dos Transportes Metropolitanos

Companhia Paulista de Trens Metropolitanos
CPTM 10